Andor Szende (14 April 1886 – 22 May 1972) was a Hungarian figure skater who competed in men's singles. He was later a coach and architect.

He won bronze medals in men's single skating at three World Figure Skating Championships: in 1910, 1912, and 1913.

He won the 1908 Hungarian junior national championships, and the men's senior singles on four occasions: 1911, 1912, 1914 and 1922. He was coached by Seiberth, from Bosnia, who worked in Budapest.

Szende excelled in a number of sports, including athletics, tennis, speed skating and sports shooting. Later he worked as a coach and a tour guide. His fate during the Holocaust is unknown, but he survived until 1972. He is buried at the Kozma Street Jewish Cemetery in Budapest.

Competitive highlights

References 

Hungarian male single skaters
Figure skaters from Budapest
Hungarian Jews
1886 births
1972 deaths